Natalya Nikolayevna Kustinskaya (5 April 1938 – 13 December 2012) was a Soviet actress, who was a Meritorious Artist of Russia from 1999.

Kustinskaya was born in Moscow, and starred in a total of twenty films. Her most recognizable roles were in Three Plus Two, Ivan Vasilievich: Back to the Future and in the TV series Eternal Call. She died on 13 December 2012 from complications of pneumonia.

Filmography

1959 – Gloomy Mourning  as Marusya 
1960 – Stronger Than A Hurricane as Katya Belyayeva 
1960 / 1961 – The First Challenges as Yadvisya
1961 – Maiden Years  as Nastya 
1962 – After the Wedding as Tonya
1962 – Dismissal to the Shore as Katya Fyodorova 
1963 – Three Plus Two as Natalya  
1965 – Sleeping Lion as Natasha Tsvetkova 
1966 – Royal Regatta as Alyona 
1971 – Spring Fairy Tale as Yelena the Beautiful 
1971 – Wandering Front as Vera Turchaninova
1973 – Ivan Vasilievich: Back to the Future  as Yakin's girlfriend 
1973 / 1983 – Eternal Call  as Polina Lakhnovskaya  
1975 – Accident as woman in car 
1976 – Apprentice as Svetlana 
1978 – Pushful Person as Irina 
1980 – My Dad, idealist as  Silva 
1981 – Driver for One Trip as Masha 
 1982 – Simply Awful! as Cat Hostess 
1989 – Svetik as Vera's mother

References

External links

 

1938 births
2012 deaths
Actresses from Moscow
Soviet film actresses
Russian film actresses
Gerasimov Institute of Cinematography alumni
Honored Artists of the Russian Federation
Deaths from pneumonia in Russia
Burials at Kuntsevo Cemetery